The Lenzspitze is a  mountain in the Pennine Alps in Switzerland. It is the southernmost peak on the Nadelgrat, a high-level ridge running roughly north–south, north of Dom in the Mischabel range, above the resort of Saas Fee to the east, and the Mattertal to the west.

Ascent
It was first climbed in August 1870 by Clinton Thomas Dent with guide Alexander Burgener and a porter, Franz Burgener, by the north-east face to the Nadeljoch and then the north-west ridge to the summit. This route is rarely used today.

The east-north-east ridge starts at the Mischabel Hut. This ridge was first climbed on 3 August 1882 by William Woodman Goodman with guides Ambros Supersaxo and Theodor Andenmatten.

Its north-east face is a classic ice climb, comprising a  wall of ice or neve at an angle of up to 56 degrees, first climbed by Dietrich von Bethmann-Hollweg with Oskar and Othmar Supersaxo on 7 July 1911. This face was descended on skis by Heini Holzer on 22 July 1972.

See also

List of 4000 metre peaks of the Alps

References

Bibliography

External links

Alpine four-thousanders
Mountains of the Alps
Mountains of Valais
Pennine Alps
Mountains of Switzerland
Four-thousanders of Switzerland